Haarmann is a German surname. Notable people with the surname include:

 Erich Haarmann (1882–1945), German geologist 
 Fritz Haarmann (1879–1925), prolific German cannibalistic serial killer, rapist, and fraudster 
 Harald Haarmann (born 1946), German linguist
 Mala Gaonkar Haarmann, American businesswoman
 Oliver Haarmann (born 1967), German private equity financier
 Stephan Haarmann
 Wilhelm Haarmann (1847–1931), German chemist

See also 
 Haarmann, a play by Marius von Mayenburg
 Haarmann, a book by Theodor Lessing
 Haarmann Hemmelrath, a now-defunct German law firm
 Harman (disambiguation)

German-language surnames